Cyclone is a 1987 science fiction action film about a woman who must keep the ultimate motorcycle from falling into the wrong hands. The film was directed by Fred Olen Ray, and stars Heather Thomas, Jeffrey Combs, Martine Beswick, Huntz Hall and Martin Landau.

Plot

Teri (Heather Thomas) leaves the gym and stops by a motorcycle repair shop to pick up parts for her inventor boyfriend Rick (Jeffery Combs). Rick has developed the ultimate motorcycle, the Cyclone. It is a $5 million bike equipped with rocket launchers and laser guns, which only needs oxygen to operate.

The funding for the cutting edge motor cycle was provided by the government who wish to take control of the vehicle. In addition, local criminal arms dealers see the motorcycle as a bonanza and are attempting to steal it to sell on the black market.

When Teri and Rick head out to a local hotspot, Rick is murdered by those who wish to gain control of the prototype. It is now up to  Teri to keep the Cyclone from falling into the wrong hands.

Teri was told in a video Rick filmed before being stabbed that she can trust Agent Bob Jenkins, but she discovers that Jenkins has also been killed.

With no one left that she can trust but herself, she must decide how to be sure the motorcycle is not misused in the future.

Cast
 Heather Thomas as Teri Marshall 
 Jeffrey Combs as Rick Davenport 
 Dar Robinson as Rolf
 Martine Beswick as Waters
 Martin Landau as Basarian
 Huntz Hall as Long John
 Troy Donahue as Bob Jenkins
 Robert Quarry as Knowles

Reception

TV Guide gave the movie 2 out of 5 stars, finding the B movie cast to be of more interest than the movie itself. According to the review site DVDtalk, the movie is fun, comparing it to an episode of Knight Rider or Street Hawk, although many of the effects are lacking by modern standards. Moria liked the premise of the film, and enjoyed Olen's genre in-jokes and sometimes an appealingly cynical sense of humor, but found that little was done with the premise. Creature Feature gave the movie two out of 5 stars, stating the movie was mostly about car chases leaving little time for plot or character  development.

RideApart.com stated that the futuristic design of the motorcycle was decent, (guessing it was a "1980-something Honda XR350/XL350") and that the number of recognizable actors was a plus. It praised the stunt riding, noting this was one of the last films of Dar Robinson. However, it was found to be about the level of a Knight Rider episode.

Production

Produced by Dda Public Relations. Released by Grey Matter Entertainment and Virgin Vision on June 5, 1987. Filmed in Los Angeles, California beginning in February 1987

Dedication
This was one of the final two films released starring stuntman Dar Robinson (Rolf), who died in November 1986 on the set of Million Dollar Mystery (released a week later in June 1987). That movie, Cyclone, and Lethal Weapon were all dedicated to his memory.

Home media

Platinum Disc released a budget DVD of the film in 2002.

Shout! Factory released the film as part of a four-film "Action-Packed Movie Marathon" DVD set on March 19, 2013.

References

External links
 

1980s science fiction action films
1980s spy films
1987 films
American science fiction action films
American spy films
CineTel Films films
1980s English-language films
Films directed by Fred Olen Ray
Motorcycling films
1980s American films